Reginald Minshall Taylor (30 November 1909 – 7 January 1984) was an English cricketer who played first-class cricket for Essex from 1931 to 1946.

He was the first professional cricketer to win the DFC, for service as an observer in Bomber Command at Dunkirk in 1940.

Dudley Carew said of him:

In the early 'thirties Taylor would have gone down on a short list [of] the most promising young batsmen in England, but somehow he could never get into the habit of making runs consistently. He had a charming cut, and could not make a stroke that was ungraceful, but whether it was some unconscious negligence in his make-up ... or some flaw in his technique, his batting average was a constant disappointment.

References

External links

1909 births
1984 deaths
Military personnel from Southend-on-Sea
English cricketers
Essex cricketers
Recipients of the Distinguished Flying Cross (United Kingdom)
Sportspeople from Southend-on-Sea
English cricketers of 1919 to 1945
Royal Air Force personnel of World War II
Royal Air Force officers